The Hlubi people or AmaHlubi are an Nguni ethnic group native to Southern Africa, with the majority of population found in KwaZulu-Natal and Eastern Cape provinces of South Africa.

Origins 

The Hlubi, similar to other current Southern African nations, originate from Central Africa. They moved as part of the eMbo people’s southern migration. More specifically, they are said to originate from the people known as the Shubi. The Shubi can still be found today in Congo and some parts of Rwanda and Tanzania.

Language 

The AmaHlubi speak a dialect closely related to the Ama Swati language, one of the Tekela languages in the Nguni branch of the Bantu language family.

The Hlubi (AmaHlubi) dialect is endangered and most Hlubi speakers are elderly and illiterate. There are attempts by Hlubi intellectuals to revive the language and make it one of the eleven recognized languages in South Africa.

See also

 Matiwane

References

Further reading

Bantu peoples
Bantu-speaking peoples of South Africa
Monarchies of South Africa